The wire strike protection system (WSPS) is a mechanical wire cutter designed to mitigate the risk of wire strikes whilst flying helicopters at low-level.

History

During the six-year period covering calendar years 1974 through 1979, wire strike accidents accounted for a significant share of United States Army Aviation peacetime mishaps, accounting for 8% of aircraft damage, 6% of aircraft-related injuries, and 16% of aircraft-related fatalities. Over a similar period covering the ten years between 1970 and 1979, 208 civil helicopters were involved in wire strike accidents. Of these, 88 were destroyed (42%) and 37 (11%) of the 331 people involved were killed. The most common cause of civil helicopter aerial accidents between 1975 and 1977 was striking wires and poles.

Bristol Aerospace developed a WSPS qualified for the Bell OH-58 Kiowa under contract to the Canadian Armed Forces in May 1979. Nelson Chan is credited with inventing WSPS, according to the patents granted in 1980.

Because the Bristol testing did not determine the effectiveness of the lower fuselage-mounted cutter, and was a ground-based test that did not evaluate how a wire strike with the cutter would affect aircraft attitude during flight, the United States Army Research Laboratory conducted supplemental pendulum swing tests at the Impact Dynamics Research Facility located at Langley Research Center with a Kiowa in October 1979. An additional deflector to protect the skids, landing gear, and tail boom (including the rotor and vertical stabilizer) was also tested, but was found to be ineffective. 

Similar pendulum tests were subsequently performed at Langley for Bell UH-1H and AH-1S helicopters in 1981 and 1982.

All small to medium  United States Army helicopters were fitted with WSPS in a retrofit programme that was completed in 1992. Between 1996 and 2002 the US Army had no fatal wire strike accidents. In civil helicopter operations, wire cutters were thought to be most effective for agricultural flights. Of the 208 wire strike accidents in the 1970s, almost half could have been avoided with wire cutters and other recommended mechanical upgrades.

Description

The system is typically mounted around the front of American military helicopters, rescue helicopters and of civilian helicopters involved in agricultural work.

The WSPS developed by Bristol, which is typical of most cable cutters today, consists of a roof-mounted cutter, a lower cutter fitted to the fuselage, and a deflector fitted to the middle of the windshield to guide the cable into the cutters. Sometimes a windshield wiper protector frame is used to stop the cables from catching on wiper motor shafts. As installed, the OH-58 WSPS developed by Bristol weighs  and requires 40 man-hours to install.

Wire Strike Protection System is a registered trademark of Magellan Aerospace, the parent company of Bristol via acquisition. Dart Aerospace markets an equivalent apparatus under the name Cable Cutter System. Cable cutting systems to protect helicopters have been developed by other manufacturers, including MD Helicopters (1981), Custom Air (1987), Airbus Helicopters (2008 and 2011), and Bell Helicopter (2014). Another invention aims to protect the rotor by equipping the control rods with cutting edges.

See also
 Wire cutter (jeep)

Notelist

References

External links
www.helicopterpage.com - WSPS (How Helicopters Work) 
Wire Strike Accidents in General Aviation: Data Analysis 1994 to 2004 – Page 33
Wire Strike Protection System, MDHS 500 Maintenance Manual
Magellan Aerospace Announces New Bell Helicopter Wire Strike Protection System Development
. Marketing video from Magellan/Bristol that includes development of WSPS. Clips from flatbed and pendulum testing are shown.
. Video of a helicopter wire strike that occurred during a rescue exercise. The helicopter was equipped with a WSPS.

Prior art

Aircraft components
Aviation safety
Helicopter equipment
Strike protection system